The 2015–16 Wisconsin Badgers men's basketball team represented the University of Wisconsin–Madison in the 2015–16 NCAA Division I men's basketball season. This was Bo Ryan's 15th season as head coach at Wisconsin, before he resigned 12 games into the season. On December 15, 2015, Ryan announced he would retire effective immediately leaving associate head coach Greg Gard as interim head coach. The team played their home games at the Kohl Center and were members of the Big Ten Conference. They finished the season 22–13, 12–6 in Big Ten play to finish in a four-way tie for third place in conference. Shortly after the regular season, Greg Gard had the interim tag removed as he was announced as the permanent head coach. The Badgers were upset by Nebraska in the second round of the Big Ten tournament. They received an at-large bid to the NCAA tournament, their 18th straight appearance in the Tournament. They defeated Pittsburgh and Xavier to advance to the Sweet Sixteen for the third consecutive year. In the Sweet Sixteen, they lost to Notre Dame.

Previous season
The Badgers finished the 2014–15 season with a record of 36–4, 16–2 in Big Ten play to win the Big Ten regular season championship. They defeated Michigan, Purdue, and Michigan State to win the Big Ten tournament and earn an automatic bid to the NCAA tournament. This marked the Badgers' 17th straight trip to the Tournament. In the Tournament, they defeated Coastal Carolina and Oregon to advance to their second straight Sweet Sixteen. They defeated North Carolina and Arizona to reach the school's fourth Final Four. By upsetting unbeaten and No. 1-ranked Kentucky 71–64 in the Final Four in Indianapolis, the Badgers moved on to play Duke in the National Championship Game, going for their first title in 74 years. However, Wisconsin lost the game 68–63.

Departures

2015 commitments

Roster

Season news

The first major news of the 2015–16 season came on June 29, 2015 when head coach Bo Ryan announced he would retire at the end of the season. However, on August 13, he backed away from his previous announcement, saying he will make a final decision by the end of 2015. He also said that he could coach some more seasons. The 2015–16 season might not be his final year.

On December 15, 2015, following a win over Texas A&M Corpus Christi in Madison, Ryan announced he would be retiring effective immediately. Assistant Coach Greg Gard was named as interim head coach.

Schedule and results
Source

|-
!colspan=12 style="background:#cc1122; color:#ffffff;"| Exhibition

|-
!colspan=12 style="background:#cc1122; color:#ffffff;"| Non-conference regular season

|-
!colspan=12 style="background:#cc1122; color:#ffffff;"| Big Ten regular season

|-
!colspan=12 style="background:#cc1122; color:#ffffff;"|Big Ten tournament

|-
!colspan=9 style="background:#cc1122; color:white;"| NCAA tournament

Rankings

Player statistics

Season highs

See also
 2015–16 Wisconsin Badgers women's basketball team

References

Wisconsin Badgers men's basketball seasons
Wisconsin
Wisconsin
Badgers men's basketball team
Badgers men's basketball team